Michael Barrett Robinson (born 24 March 1967) is a former cricketer who played List A cricket for the ACT Comets in the Mercantile Mutual Cup.

A wicket-keeper, Robinson played a match against the touring West Indian side in Toowoomba in 1996/97, as a member of an Australian Country XI. He top scored for his team with 50 not out, from seventh in the batting order.

In the 1998/99 Australian domestic season, he appeared in three matches one day matches for the Comets, which included a win over Tasmania at Manuka Oval.

References

External links

1967 births
Living people
Australian cricketers
ACT Comets cricketers
Cricketers from Victoria (Australia)
People from Maffra
Wicket-keepers